The Front Royal Cardinals are a collegiate summer baseball team in Front Royal, Virginia, USA, playing in the northern division of the Valley Baseball League. They play their home games at Bing Crosby Stadium, which is located within the Warren County-run Gertrude E. Miller Recreational Park.

References

External links
Valley Baseball League
Front Royal Cardinal Baseball

Amateur baseball teams in Virginia
Valley Baseball League teams
Front Royal, Virginia
Baseball teams established in 1984
1984 establishments in Virginia